Where Did We Go Wrong may refer to:
 "Where Did We Go Wrong" (Dondria song), 2010
 "Where Did We Go Wrong" (Toni Braxton and Babyface song), 2013
 "Where Did We Go Wrong", a song by Petula Clark from the album My Love
 "Where Did We Go Wrong", a song by Diana Ross from the album Ross
 "Where Did We Go Wrong", a 1980 song by Frankie Valli